Oscar is an unincorporated community in Valley Township, Armstrong County, Pennsylvania, United States.

History
A post office called Oscar was established on July 25, 1861, with Francis Martin as its postmaster. It remained in operation until 1886. Oscar P.O. appears in the 1876 Atlas of Armstrong County, Pennsylvania.

References

Unincorporated communities in Armstrong County, Pennsylvania
Unincorporated communities in Pennsylvania